Heinz Riegler (born 11 August 1969) is an Austrian-born artist working between Australia and Europe.
First emerging as a songwriter and performer in the late 1980s, Riegler worked both as a solo artist and performer as well as frequent collaborator and contributor to a variety of projects. He was a founding mainstay of indie rockers, Not from There (1991–2001), which won Best Alternative Release for their debut album, Sand on Seven (November 1998), at the ARIA Music Awards of 1999. Riegler was shortlisted twice for the Grant McLennan Memorial Fellowship and is the co-founder of minus20degree, a biennial art and architecture festival located in the Austrian Alps.

1990s

As founder, vocalist, guitarist and principal songwriter of the ARIA Music Award. The band released two albums in Sand On Seven, Latvian Lovers, along with numerous EP's and singles, performing from 1991 through to 2000.

2000s

Riegler went on to collaborate with Lawrence English and Tam Patton (Full Fathom Five) in the Brisbane-based experimental/improv group I/O3. The group released two limited edition LPs, Powerhouse Sessions and A Picturesque View, Ignored on the Room40 label. As a member of I/O3, Riegler has collaborated with the likes of sound artists Mike Cooper, David Toop, Robin Rimbaud (Scanner), Ben Frost and DJ Olive.  Around the beginning of the decade Riegler also contributed guitars to Lawrence English's Transit and Calm  LPs as well as adding lyrics and vocals to Adam Franklin’s solo debut project Toshack Highway.

Riegler formed the Brisbane-based group Nightstick in 2004 with Tam Patton and Martin Lee. A short-lived project, the group toured Australia frequently and released a self-titled EP on the Dot Dash label.
	
Following some time out from musical endeavours, Riegler has since returned to work on material for a solo album as well as performing live. Riegler has also curated an extensive season of improvised live scores for the Queensland Gallery of Modern Art. The three-month season in late 2008, titled Out of The Shadows: German Expressionism And Beyond, saw Riegler hand-pick a selection of artists to perform live scores to silent films. During the season, Riegler also took on a number of improvised performances in solo mode.

Twice shortlisted for the Grant McLennan Memorial Fellowship in 2008 and 2009, Riegler began to perform new material live in concert around the same time. Containing audio recordings from the previous ten years, Riegler released a limited edition of 60 audio cassettes in 2009. Titled Survey #1, the cassette contained demo songs, excerpts from The Shadows: German Expressionism And Beyond instrumental works, as well as other previously unreleased compositions and collaborations.

2009 also saw Riegler exhibit 'Five Frames,’ a debut collection of visual art works as part of a group exhibition at Brisbane’s Doggett Street Studios.

2010s

In October 2010, Riegler released a limited edition 7-inch vinyl single titled "And The Lovers Make A Scene" / "Andy Looks Up At The Sky," collaborating with three visual artists (Bo Stahlman, Alex Gillies, Stephen Mok) to create three sets of artwork. The entire collection of 7-inch vinyl was then released as part of an exhibition at Brisbane's Doggett Street Studios gallery.

To mark 10 years since Room40's release of A Picturesque View, Ignored LP in 2001, Riegler returned to perform with I/O3, David Toop and Scanner (Robin Rimbaud) for the Open Frame Festival at London’s Cafe Oto.

Riegler spent large parts of 2011 in his native Austria working on recording projects, as well as completing a single channel video piece titled Motion Portrait #1. This work was named winner at MICA TonBild 2011 in Vienna, Austria in November 2011 and two years later was selected for the inaugural Channels Festival and Ikono Festival, where it screened at the Australian Centre for the Moving Image in September 2013.

At the end of 2011 Riegler returned to perform at London’s Cafe Oto as part of Lawrence English’s Lonely Women’s Club and released of a number of online single channel video vignettes titled ’60 Seconds in Flachau’ and 'Keep that Heart Pumping'.

Audio recordings made in Austria during an 80-day spell in an alpine mountain cabin were released titled Survey #2 (One Thousand Dreams I Never Had) on Room40’s new A Guide To Saints imprint in May 2012. An accompanying single channel video piece titled No Colour/No Sound, Part I was subsequently premiered on Australian music website Mess & Noise. A track titled ‘Morning’ formed the basis of the soundtrack to a Paul W Rankin short video piece titled BNE 6:07 AM.

References

External links 
 Official Site

Living people
Australian rock musicians
Australian people of Austrian descent
Musicians from Vienna
Musicians from Queensland
Austrian emigrants to Australia
1969 births